Jurgen Mattheij (born 1 April 1993) is a Dutch professional footballer who plays as a centre back for Bulgarian club CSKA Sofia.

Club career

Born in Rotterdam, Mattheij began his professional career at Excelsior in 2011. In his eight seasons with the club he played 188 games and scored 9 goals. In June 2019 he joined Sparta Rotterdam before moving to CSKA Sofia a year later. Mattheij soon established itself as a key player for the "redmen", becoming the team's captain. He also developed a knack for scoring decisive goals, including a last-minute one in extra time in the second leg against Viktoria Plzeň held on 26 August 2021 to secure the team's entry into the UEFA Europa Conference League group stage, and a winning goal against Bulgarian champions Ludogorets Razgrad in a First League match that took place on 20 December 2021. During 2021, he managed a career-high 7 goals in all tournaments. Mattheij's winning strike against CSKA 1948 on 8 November was voted goal of the season in Bulgarian football for 2021.

Career statistics

Honours

Team
CSKA Sofia
 Bulgarian Cup: 2020–21

Individual
Best goal in Bulgarian football for 2021
Best defender in Bulgarian football for 2021
Best foreign player in Bulgarian football for 2021 (shared with Jordy Caicedo)

References

External links
 

1993 births
Living people
Dutch footballers
Association football central defenders
Excelsior Rotterdam players
Sparta Rotterdam players
PFC CSKA Sofia players
Eredivisie players
Eerste Divisie players
First Professional Football League (Bulgaria) players
Dutch expatriate footballers
Dutch expatriate sportspeople in Bulgaria
Expatriate footballers in Bulgaria
Footballers from Rotterdam